"Ocean Pie" is the fourth single release from Britpop band Shed Seven's debut album, Change Giver. The single was released in October 1994 and peaked at number 33 on the UK Singles Chart.

Track listings
All tracks except track one were produced by Shed Seven and Tim Lewis.

7-inch and cassette single
 "Ocean Pie" (4:39)
 "Never Again" (3:35)

12-inch and CD single
 "Ocean Pie" (4:39)
 "Never Again" (3:35)
 "Sleep Easy" (3:20)
 "Sensitive" (4:05)

References

1994 singles
1994 songs
Polydor Records singles
Shed Seven songs